Ben Coleman may refer to:

 Ben Coleman (basketball) (1961–2019)
 Ben Coleman (American football) (born 1971)
 Ben Coleman (squash player) (born 1991)

See also
 Benjamin Wilson Coleman (1869–1939), Justice of the Supreme Court of Nevada